The Chandra Deep Field South (CDF-S) is an image taken by the Chandra X-ray Observatory satellite. The location was chosen because, like the Lockman Hole, it is a relatively clear "window" through the ubiquitous clouds of neutral hydrogen gas in the Milky Way galaxy, which allows observers to clearly see the rest of the universe in X-rays.  The image is centered on RA  DEC  (J2000.0), covering 0.11 square degrees, measuring 16 arcminutes across. This patch of sky lies in the Fornax constellation.

The image was created by compositing 11 individual ACIS-I exposures for a cumulative exposure time of over one million seconds, in the period 1999–2000, by a team led by Riccardo Giacconi. This region was selected for observation because it has much less galactic gas and dust to obscure distant sources. Further observations taken between 2000 and 2010 have resulted in a total of exposure of over four million seconds. An additional four million seconds of exposure are scheduled to be undertaken by the end of 2015, resulting in an integrated exposure time of eight million seconds. The Chandra Deep Field South is the single target where Chandra has observed the longest.

Multispectral observations of the region were carried out in collaboration with the Very Large Telescope and the Paranal Observatory. Through the course of these investigations, the X-ray background was determined to have originated from the central supermassive black holes of distant galaxies, and a better characterization of Type II quasars was obtained. The CDFS discovered over 300 X-ray sources, many of them from "low luminosity" AGN lying about 9 billion light years away. The study also discovered the then most distant Type II quasar, lying at redshift z=3.7, some 12 billion light years away.

In 2014 and 2015 astronomers detected four very intense burst of X-rays, currently unexplained, from a small galaxy, known as CDF-S XT1, about 11 billion light years from Earth in the Fornax constellation.

See also
 Hubble Deep Field South
 List of deep fields

Notes

References
 NASA PR 01-37 "Deepest X-Rays Ever Reveal universe Teeming With Black Holes" March 13, 2001 (accessed 10 October 2009)

Citations

External links
 A Pool of Distant Galaxies – the deepest ultraviolet image of the Universe yet – ESO Photo Release
 APOD Chandra Deep Field South
 Smoothed and enhanced version of CDF-S

Astronomy image articles
Fornax (constellation)
2001 works
2000s photographs